Samuel A. Taylor (June 13, 1912 – May 26, 2000) was an American playwright and screenwriter.

Biography

Born Samuel Albert Tanenbaum, in a Jewish family, in Chicago, Illinois, Taylor made his Broadway debut as author of the play The Happy Time in 1950. He wrote the play Sabrina Fair (1953) and co-wrote its film adaptation released the following year. In 1955, he won a Golden Globe and was nominated for an Academy Award for the screenplay. His early success brought him more work in Hollywood, including the biographical film The Eddy Duchin Story (1956) and the Alfred Hitchcock classic Vertigo (1958).
  
His film career faded after the initial box office failure of Vertigo, though Hitchcock and Taylor remained frequent collaborators. He was often contracted to write drafts for Hitchcock's later films, such as Torn Curtain (1966), though Taylor's only other Hitchcock screenplay (apart from Vertigo) was for Topaz (1969).

Taylor was nominated for his only Tony Award as co-producer of the musical play No Strings (1962), for which he also wrote the book. Other playwrighting credits include Avanti! (1968), which was later adapted for the Billy Wilder film released in 1972, and Legend (1976).

Taylor died of heart failure in Blue Hill, Maine. His credits are sometimes confused with those of novelist and screenwriter Samuel W. Taylor.

Broadway credits
The Happy Time (1951)
Nina (1951)
Sabrina Fair (1953)
The Pleasure of His Company (1958)
First Love (1961)
No Strings (1962)
Beekman Place (1964)
Avanti! (1968)
Legend (1976)

Additional screenwriting credits
Sabrina (1954)
The Eddy Duchin Story (1956)
The Monte Carlo Story (1956; also directed)
Vertigo (1958)
Goodbye Again (1961)
The Love Machine (1971)
Avanti! (1972)

References

External links
 Official website

1912 births
2000 deaths
20th-century American dramatists and playwrights
American male screenwriters
American theatre directors
Writers from Chicago
American male dramatists and playwrights
20th-century American male writers
Screenwriters from Illinois
20th-century American screenwriters